Alfred Walter Henry Allen, Baron Allen of Fallowfield, CBE (7 July 1914 – 14 January 1985) was a British trade unionist and governor of the BBC.

Early life 
Born in Bristol, he was educated at East Bristol School and worked then for the Bristol Co-operative Society until 1940, when he joined the Royal Air Force. After the end of the Second World War in 1945, Allen left the Force as a sergeant and was chosen as an area organiser of the National Union of Distributive and Allied Workers in the year thereafter. Following its merger into the Union of Shop, Distributive and Allied Workers in 1947, he became a national officer in 1951. Allen was elected the Union's general secretary in 1962, a post he held for seventeen years until 1979. In the 1967 Birthday Honours, he was appointed a Commander of the Order of the British Empire (CBE).

Allen was a member of the general council of the Trades Union Congress and in 1974 was nominated its president. On 10 July of the latter year, he was created a life peer with the title Baron Allen of Fallowfield, of Fallowfield, in Greater Manchester. In 1977, Allen served in the Board of Governors of the BBC.

In 1940, he married Ruby Millicent Hounsell and they had a son and a daughter.

References

External links

1914 births
1985 deaths
BBC Governors
Commanders of the Order of the British Empire
Allen of Fallowfield
Life peers created by Elizabeth II
Members of the General Council of the Trades Union Congress
Presidents of the Trades Union Congress
General Secretaries of the Union of Shop, Distributive and Allied Workers